Eric Vivier is a French professor of immunology at Aix-Marseille and hospital practitioner at Marseille Public University Hospital. He is also Chief Scientific Officer at Innate Pharma, coordinator of the Marseille Immunopôle immunology cluster,  and president of the Paris-Saclay Cancer Cluster, the first biocluster selected by the French government as part of the France 2030 program.

Biography 
Vivier was born in Clamart, France. He graduated from the Ecole Nationale Vétérinaire de Maisons-Alfort and received his doctoral degree in immunology from Paris XI University. He began his postdoctoral training as a Fogarty International Center Research Fellow at Harvard Medical School with Paul J. Anderson and Stuart F. Schlossman (the Dana-Farber Cancer Institute).

He joined Aix-Marseille University as a professor at the Centre d'Immunologie de Marseille-Luminy (CIML) in 1993, becoming its director in 2008 until 2017. Vivier is one of four immunologists whose research led to the creation of  the biotech company Innate-Pharma in 1999. In 2014, he was also one of the founders of the Marseille-Immunopole, an immunology cluster linking fundamental research, therapeutic innovation, and industrial development in the Aix-Marseille region.

In addition to his academic activities, he became the chief scientific officer of Innate Pharma in January 2018. In 2022, he took over the presidency of the PSCC (Paris Saclay Cancer Cluster), designated in December 2022 as the first winner of the "Biocluster" call for expressions of interest under the France 2030 program launched by the French government to promote investment, innovation and re-industrialization. The PSCC's ambition is to position France among the world leaders in the field of cancer, transforming science into value for patients and society.

Scientific insights 
Vivier has made contributions to the understanding of the molecular basis of the ontogeny, function, and therapeutic manipulation of natural killer (NK) cells, and the identification of innate lymphoid cells (ILCs) in mice and humans. His research has had a profound influence on the field of innate immunology.

His early work determined the mode of action of the inhibitory MHC class I receptors expressed on NK cells and extended the concept of ITIM-bearing molecules to multiple cell types and multiple biologic functions. In parallel, his group identified the ITAM-bearing polypeptide, KARAP/DAP12/Tyrobp.

These studies on NK cells led to the involvement of the Vivier laboratory in the discovery of ILCs through the detection and characterization of the ILC3 cell subset in human and mouse intestines.

Vivier has published more than 300 scientific articles and is on the editorial boards of leading peer-reviewed journals. He serves on the expert panel of the European Research Council and the committees of pharmaceutical and biotechnology companies.

Awards and honours 
 the French National League against Cancer (1996, 2004, and 2013)
 the National Award and Tremplins Rhône-Poulenc Award for Biotech start-ups (1999)
 the Lucien Tartois Award from the Fondation pour la Recherche Médicale (1999)
 the Jacques Oudin Award from the French Society for Immunology (2003)
 the Deutsche Gesellschaft für Immunologie/EFIS Award (2004)
 the Grand Prix Turpin in Oncology (2008)
 the Grand Prix Charles Oberling in Oncology (2010)
 the Australasian Society for Immunology, Visiting Speaker Programme Award (2015)
 Thomson Reuter,s Highly Cited Researcher (2015;2016,2017) 
In 2007, Vivier became a senior fellow of the Institut Universitaire de France, and, in 2013, he was elected to the French National Academy of Medicine. 

In 2016, he was awarded honorary citizen of the city of Cassis, Chevalier de la Légion d’Honneur and Ambassadeur de la ville de Marseille.

Current positions 

 Professor of Immunology, Marseille Medical School and Assistance-Publique des Hôpitaux de Marseille (PU-PH Classe Exceptionnelle)
 Head of the “NK cells and Innate Immunity” lab, CIML.
 Head of the NK monitoring lab, Conception Hospital, Marseille.
 Co-founder and coordinator of the Federation Hospitalo-Universitaire Marseille Immunopole.
 Chief Scientific Officer and Senior Vice President of Innate Pharma.
 President of the Paris-Saclay Cancer Cluster.

References

External links 
 Eric Viver fact sheet on the Institut Universitaire de France website
 Eric Vivier fact sheet on the Académie Nationale de Médecine web site
 Listing of scientific publications on Google Scholar
 Innate Pharma founders
 Marseille Immunopole
 Innate Pharma

Academic staff of Aix-Marseille University
Living people
Year of birth missing (living people)